Alyth Junction railway station served the village of Meigle in the Scottish county of Perth and Kinross. The station was the junction where the Alyth Railway and the Dundee and Newtyle Railway diverged from the Scottish Midland Junction Railway running between Perth and Arbroath.

The station is in the Angus council area, just over the border from Meigle.

History
Opened by the Scottish North Eastern Railway, and absorbed into the Caledonian Railway, it became part of the London, Midland and Scottish Railway during the Grouping of 1923. Passing on to the Scottish Region of British Railways on nationalisation in 1948, it was then closed by the British Railways Board.

The site today

Today some of the platforms remain and the site is waterlogged.

References

Notes

Sources

External links
 RAILSCOT on Alyth Railway 
 RAILSCOT on Scottish Midland Junction Railway
 RAILSCOT on Dundee and Newtyle Railway

Disused railway stations in Angus, Scotland
Railway stations in Great Britain opened in 1861
Railway stations in Great Britain closed in 1967
Former Caledonian Railway stations
Beeching closures in Scotland
1861 establishments in Scotland